Arthopyrenia is a genus of fungi within the Arthopyreniaceae family. The genus has a widespread distribution, a cosmopolitan distribution. It formerly (in 2008) contained about 117 species.

Species
As accepted by Species Fungorum, (note out of the 355 records, only 59 are still Arthopyrenia); 

 Arthopyrenia agasthiensis 
 Arthopyrenia algovica 
 Arthopyrenia aloes 
 Arthopyrenia analepta 
 Arthopyrenia aphorisasa 
 Arthopyrenia betulicola 
 Arthopyrenia biroi 
 Arthopyrenia bispora 
 Arthopyrenia bukowinensis 
 Arthopyrenia calcicola 
 Arthopyrenia callunae 
 Arthopyrenia carneobrunneola 
 Arthopyrenia cerasi 
 Arthopyrenia ceylonensis 
 Arthopyrenia cinereopruinosa 
 Arthopyrenia claviformis 
 Arthopyrenia colleta 
 Arthopyrenia contraria 
 Arthopyrenia coppinsii 
 Arthopyrenia degelii 
 Arthopyrenia desistens 
 Arthopyrenia dirumpens 
 Arthopyrenia elachistotera 
 Arthopyrenia exasperata 
 Arthopyrenia fallacior 
 Arthopyrenia fallaciosa 
 Arthopyrenia gravastella 
 Arthopyrenia grisea 
 Arthopyrenia keralensis 
 Arthopyrenia macquariensis 
 Arthopyrenia maritima 
 Arthopyrenia minor 
 Arthopyrenia naevia 
 Arthopyrenia novae-guineae 
 Arthopyrenia oblongens 
 Arthopyrenia pandanicola 
 Arthopyrenia picconii 
 Arthopyrenia platypyrenia 
 Arthopyrenia plumbaria 
 Arthopyrenia praetermissa 
 Arthopyrenia salicis 
 Arthopyrenia spilobola 
 Arthopyrenia stenotheca 
 Arthopyrenia stigmatophora 
 Arthopyrenia subcerasi 
 Arthopyrenia subfallaciosa 
 Arthopyrenia subgregans 
 Arthopyrenia subpomacea 
 Arthopyrenia subpunctiformis 
 Arthopyrenia subvelata 
 Arthopyrenia taxodii 
 Arthopyrenia texensis 
 Arthopyrenia tuscanensis 
 Arthopyrenia welwitschii 
 Arthopyrenia zostra 

See also List of former species of Arthopyrenia

References

External links 
 Arthopyrenia at Index Fungorum

Pleosporales
Lichen genera
Dothideomycetes genera
Taxa named by Abramo Bartolommeo Massalongo